O'Reilly (24 August 1993 - 31 December 2014) was a New Zealand bred and trained thoroughbred racehorse who won two Group 1 races.

O'Reilly was bred by Waikato Stud Holdings Limited. His dam, Courtza, was the winner of the 1989 Golden Slipper Stakes. He was named after the Irish international rugby player and businessman Tony O'Reilly. 

He was entered in the 1995 Karaka Yearling Sales but was unable to be sold when he failed a veterinary test, due to an abnormality in his larynx, so he was retained by his owner, Gary Chittick.

Racing career

O'Reilly was initially placed with Melbourne trainer, Gerald Ryan, but due to injuries was put out to paddock for eight months. After his rest he was then trained by Dave and Paul O'Sullivan at Matamata and ridden in all his races by Lance O'Sullivan.

In the November 1996 Bayer Classic Group 1 event for 3 year old horses at Otaki, he beat High Return and Rebel.

In January 1997, he contested the Telegraph Handicap at Trentham, an open handicap event over 1200m, winning by 2 3/4 lengths in 1:07.36 over Krispin Klear and Jazzac.

On 15 February 1997, he placed second to Mouawad in the Australian Guineas 1600m at Flemington Racecourse.

However, during his next start, in the 1200m Newmarket Handicap at Flemington, he ruptured a suspensory ligament which finished his racing career after only six race day starts.

Remarkably, O’Reilly was New Zealand Horse of the Year for 1996 and 1997, champion sprinter, and champion miler.

Stud career

After sustaining an injury that caused him to retire from racing, O'Reilly was put to stallion duties at Waikato Stud.

O'Reilly proved to be very successful as a stallion and ended up standing for a fee of $60,000.

Notable progeny

O'Reilly has produced 15 individual Group One winners:

c = colt, f = filly, g = gelding

He was New Zealand's top sire in 2007/08, 2011/12, 2012/13, and 2013/14.

As a Dam Sire

Daughters of O'Reilly have produced stakes winners such as:

 Daffodil (No Excuse Needed - Spring), winner of the 2008 New Zealand 1000 Guineas, 2009 AJC Oaks and Windsor Park Plate. 
 Steps In Time (Danehill Dancer - Rare Insight), winner of the 2012 Bill Ritchie Handicap, 2012 & 2013 Breeders Classic and 2014 Coolmore Classic.
 Mo'unga (Savabeel - Chandelier), winner of the 2021 Winx Stakes and Rosehill Guineas

Sire sons

A number of sons of O'Reilly have become sires:

 Alamosa (2004, dam: Lodore Mystic by Centaine), sire of Kirramosa and Stolen Dance 
 O'Reilly's Choice (2013, Dorotea Dior by Redoute's Choice)
 Sacred Falls (2009-2019, Iguazu's Girl by Redoute's Choice), sire of Icebath and Aegon 
 Shamexpress (2009, Volkrose by Volksraad), sire of Coventina Bay
 The King (2011, The Grin by Grosvenor)

See also

Thoroughbred racing in New Zealand

References 

Champion Thoroughbred Sires of New Zealand
New Zealand racehorses
Racehorses bred in New Zealand
Racehorses trained in New Zealand
1993 racehorse births
2014 racehorse deaths
New Zealand Thoroughbred sires